PhotoModeler is a software application that performs image-based modeling and close range photogrammetry – producing 3D models and measurements from photography. The software is used for close-range, aerial and uav photogrammetry.

Close Range Photogrammetry (CRP) can mean photographs taken from the ground with a handheld camera, or taken from a UAV/drone at a relatively low altitude. PhotoModeler and CRP are used for performing measurement and modeling in agriculture, archaeology, architecture, biology, engineering, fabrication, film production, forensics, mining, stockpile volumes, etc.

How Photomodeler works 
1) Take photos from different angles: Ensure that many images are taken to capture the entire object. The amount of required images varies accordingly to the size and complexity of the object being captured. 

2) Load images into Photomodeler software: Upload the images by any means on to the computer. 

3) Chose the method: Chose one amongst the four following options.

 Manual marking: Marking and Referencing is the process of manually matching common features across multiple photos. Click on a distinct visual feature on one photo and match it to the same feature on other photos taken from different angles. 

 Coded target detection: Photomodeler automatically detects applied or projected targets and solves for an accurate set of 3D points representing each target center. Coded targets provide the additional ability to reference targets between photos. The resulting points can be used for line, curve and surface modeling (and Surface Draw), or measurement and export as needed.
 Smartmatch/ DSM: Dense surface modeling tools are used to automatically detect and match features across multiple overlapping photos. The result is a dense point cloud that can optionally be triangulated/surfaced to form the shape. Projects built with DSM tools can be supplemented with traditional modeling features, such as points and lines. 
 Smartmatch/ DSM-Aerial: Photomodeler UAS uses SmartMatch to automatically detect common features across overlapping aerial photos, allowing DMS to generate 3D point cloud models and surfaces. Models can be enhanced with wireframe line-work, ortho-photos, contours, volumes, geo-referencing, and more. 

4) Review, measure, and export

Applications 
Some of the applications of PhotoModeler are:
 Accident reconstruction / Forensics
 Archaeology / Paleontology
 Architecture
 Biology
 Engineering
 Fabrication and Manufacturing
 Film
 Mining
 Situational Awareness (SA)

See also
Stereophotogrammetry
3D data acquisition and object reconstruction
Image-based modeling and rendering
Computer vision
3D scanner

Notes and references

Notes

 
 
 
 
 
 
 
 
 
 
 
 
 

Photogrammetry software